The Hate Ship is a 1929 British mystery film directed by Norman Walker and starring Jameson Thomas, Jean Colin and Jack Raine. It was made at Elstree Studios by British International Pictures.

Cast
 Jameson Thomas as Vernon Wolfe  
 Jean Colin as Sylvia Paget  
 Jack Raine as Roger Peel  
 Henry Victor as Count Boris Ivanoff 
 Randle Ayrton as Captain MacDonnell 
 Edna Davies as Lisette - Maid  
 Carl Harbord as Arthur Wardell  
 Allan Jeayes as Dr. Saunders  
 Maria Minetti as Countess Olga Karova  
 Charles Dormer as Nigel Menzies  
 Ivo Dawson as Colonel Paget 
 Syd Crossley as Rigby - Valet  
 Charles Emerald as Bullock

References

Bibliography
 Wood, Linda. British Films, 1927-1939. British Film Institute, 1986.

External links

1929 films
British mystery films
1929 mystery films
1920s English-language films
Films directed by Norman Walker
Films shot at British International Pictures Studios
Seafaring films
British black-and-white films
1920s British films